A. J. Verel (born March 2, ?) is an American kickboxer, martial artist, actor, stuntman and inductee into the Pro Martial Arts/MMA Hall of Fame.
Verel is a former Light Heavyweight & Middleweight sport karate and kickboxing Champion. In 1992 he won the World Kickboxing Association's (WKA) Middleweight title. Verel holds black belts in five different martial arts and as co-captain of the U.S. National Martial Arts and N.A.C.K. (North American Champions Karate) Demonstration Teams won two gold medals.

Verel returned to the Original Toughman Contest in 2000 as the shows referee for the FOX televised reality show titled Toughman Contest Championship Series which ran for five seasons on the FX Network. Verel is active working on and appearing in movies, training fighters and producing televised events. Verel is the Chairman for the Official "Pro Martial Arts Hall of Fame & Museum" Chartered by New York States Education Department. In June 2010 Verel was named the United States Delegate for the 'World Kickboxing League" (WKL) for all Ring Sports along with Ambassadors Rick "The Jet" Rufus and Don "The Dragon" Wilson.

Education
Verel holds degrees in Psychology, Business, and Education.

Sporting career

Martial arts
Verel holds black belts in five different styles of martial arts and has been training since the age of 9. Verel was a member of the U.S. / Canadian (Can/Am) Tae Kwon Do demonstration team and the N.A.C.K. Team, which won two Gold Medals in 1988 and 1992. Like fellow kickboxers "Joe Lewis", "Troy Dorsey", "Benny Urquidez", and "Rick Roufus", Verel has a strong classical boxing background. Verel is credited with fellow Hall of Famers Joe Lewis, "Bill Wallace, and Troy Dorsey, for winning both World Sport Karate and Kickboxing Titles in the same year.

Original Toughman Contest
Verel won two consecutive boxing competitions in the Original "Toughman Contest".

KickBoxing
Verel is credited with winning four World Titles in two separate weight classes. The "World Kickboxing Association" (WKA) and "World Kickboxing Organization" (WKO) World Middleweight Titles, and the "World Kickboxing Council" (WKC) and "World Kickboxing League" (WKL) Light Heavyweight Titles.

Mixed Martial Arts
Verel coached and trained fighters for "Ultimate Fighting Championship" I-VII, the "International Fighting Championships", "King Of The Cage", and Combat Zone as well as being an alternate himself.

Media career

Stage
In 1993 Verel was featured in two professional stage productions, Anything Goes, with Tony Award Winning Actress Debbie Shapiro-Gravitte and Tony nominated Actor Ray DeMattis and also the production Damn Yankees with Brian Sutherland.

Film

Verel first appeared in Talons of the Eagle and T.C. 2000 with Tae Bo creator Billy Blanks. Verel became a union actor and stunt coordinator after having appeared in Against the Ropes, which starred Meg Ryan, Omar Epps, Tony Shaloub and Tim Daly. The film was also directed by actor/director Charles S. Dutton.

Verel has appeared in several features to date including Moving Target, Shadow Creature, Poultrygeist, Little Chicago, STAR TREK, Unstoppable, Starring Denzel Washington and Chris Pine, Tammy, The American Side, Best Man Holiday and The Amazing Spider-Man 2.

Production work
Behind the camera Verel has been in the role of stunt coordinator/stunt performer/second unit director and producer on a number of projects. Such as Shadow Creature, T.C. 2000, Talons of the Eagle, Star Trek, Back in Action and The Brawl in the Falls, which featured heavyweight boxers "Big" Michael Grant, and "The Italian Hitman" Paul Marinaccio.

Television
Verel has appeared as a boxing analyst for CNN, LCTV, SportsBlast TV and Sunshine Sports. Verel was the chief official for four seasons on the FX reality show Toughman Championship Series.

Professional and political career 
Verel has been called as an expert to testify on combative sports. His knowledge of combative sport laws, his personal ring experience, educational and emergency medical background is why FSN and API chose him for television as a commentator and chief referee. Verel has officiated in 4 Different countries and over 20 of the United States. He has officiated over 2,500 boxing matches, 600 kickboxing and MMA and 40 professional entertainment wrestling matches.

In 1997 Verel was involved in bringing action against NYS to allow combative sports after Governor George Pataki signed a Bill outlawing it and won minor victories is getting injunctions for a short period along with API a promotions company out of Michigan. In 2010 Verel after Chartering the Martial Arts/MMA Hall of Fame with the NYS Department of Education Verel wrote Bill proposals that would legalize MMA in New York since its ban in 1997. His Bill proposal called for establishing and promulgating rules for professionals and a commission to oversee all amateur combative sports and single discipline martial arts. The Bill finally saw passage and was signed into Law by Gov.Andrew Cuomo in 2016.

Verel ran for a vacant seat in the Buffalo Common Council in 2012. Though he was initially considered a standout in the race after a 3-month 4-4 tie vote, he failed to gain the necessary support after false allegations of a criminal history and prison sentence arose. On April 25, 2012 "The Buffalo News" reported that Verel had twice been arrested for Burglary. The first, in 1989, alleged a conviction and prison sentence served between July 20, 1989, and May 31, 1991. However no credible evidence supports this and searches of New York State Records show no conviction, sentence or incarceration. The story goes on to allege that Verel was again arrested on second degree burglary charges in 1998. Again, no evidence exists in Court Records to support this allegation. Verel opened action against The Buffalo News for Reckless Disregard for the Truth citing New York Times Co. v. Sullivan, 376 U.S. 254.

In 2014 Verel was sworn in as a Reserve Deputy Sheriff by Timothy B. Howard the Erie County Sheriff in New York  where he was assigned to the Scientific Staff Division. Then in 2016 A. J. Verel was elected and sworn in as the 52nd President of the Judges & Police Executives Conference of Erie County, NY.

Career highlights 

	1986 Canton Civic Center First Pro Fight (WKA)
	1988 U.S. TKD Demo Team (Result: Team Gold Medal) (WKA)
	1991 Toughman Contest Champion
	1992 U.S. DEMO TKD & N.A.C.K. Team Co-Capt. (Result: Team Gold Medal) (WKA)
	June 1992 Hard Knock Series Atlantic City, NJ - 4th-round decision over John Lucarrelli
	October 1992 WKA World Championship Title Fight Asheville, NC (72.5 kg-160 lbs)
	Opponent: Derrick "The Destroyer" Littlefield (Arkansas) (Title Holder)
	Result: TKO 3rd round
	1992 Feature Film "Moving Target" w/ Gerry Cooney
  	1993 Feature Film : Talons of the Eagle" with Billy Blanks
	Independent Film "Too Much Too Soon"
	1993 Klassic Karate Cup Buffalo, NY
	1993 ArtPark Lewiston, NY Summer Production "Anything Goes" w/ Tony award-winning actress Debbie Shapiro
	November 1993 UFC 1 Denver, CO
	April 1994 Klassic Karate Cup Dallas, TX
	Feature Film "TC 2000" w/ Billy Blanks
	1994 I.P.T.F. (Itn’l Professional Tae Kwon Do Federation) Man of the Year
	July 1994 WKO World Championship Fight Yakima, WA
	WKO Super Middleweight (72.5–76 kg – 164 lbs) World Championship
	Opponent: Takuro Takahashi (Kanazawa, Japan) (Title Holder)
	Result: KKO 7th round
	June 1995 WKC World Championship Fight HorseHeads, NY
	WKC Light Heavyweight (76–79 kg – 174 lbs) World Championship
	Opponent: Marc "Nasty" Naughton (Chico,Ca) (Vacant Title)
	Result: Majority Decision
	1995–2003 Toughman Contest Referee and Commentator on Fox Sports FX Channel
	2002 Feature Film "Against the Ropes" w/ Meg Ryan, Tony Shaloub, Omar Epps, Tim Daly, and Charles Dutton
	2003 Romulus Club and Ilio DiPaolo Award
	2003 Induction into World Karate & KickBoxing Hall of Fame
	June 2003 World Karate Union Hall of Fame
	July 2003 United States Martial Arts Association Hall of Fame / Lifetime Achievement
	2000–2003 SportsBlast TV
	2003 CNN Boxing Analyst
	2003 LCTV Commentator
	2003 Action Martial Art Magazine Award
Repeated:
	2005
	2006
	2008
	2004 Took over operations as GM for the Martial Arts Hall of Fame
	2006 Feature Film "Poultrygeist"
	2007 Feature Film "Little Chicago" w/ Marisa Tomei and Ray Liotta
	2007 Succeeded in getting Museum Chartership status for the new Pro Martial Arts Hall of Fame
	2008 Named Chairman for the Pro Martial Arts Hall of Fame
	2009 Feature Film "STAR TREK"
	2010 Feature Film "Unstoppable"
       2011 Feature Film "Crimson"
	2012 TV Movie "Battle Dogs"
	2013 Feature Film "Best Man Holiday"
	2013 TV Movie "Tammy"
	2014 Feature Film "The American Side"
	2014 TV Movie "The Amazing-Spider-Man 2"
       2014 Sworn in as a Deputy Sheriff in New York
       2015 Feature Film "EMELIE"
       2016 Feature Film "MERCY"
       2016 Became the 52nd President of the Judges & Police Executives Conference in Erie County, NY

References

American male kickboxers
Middleweight kickboxers
Light heavyweight kickboxers
Living people
Year of birth missing (living people)